The gray brush-furred rat (Lophuromys aquilus) is a species of rodent in the family Muridae. It is found only in Democratic Republic of the Congo. Its natural habitats are subtropical or tropical swamps, subtropical or tropical moist montane forests, and subtropical or tropical high-altitude grassland. It is threatened by habitat loss.

References
 Boitani, L. 2004.  Lophuromys cinereus.   2006 IUCN Red List of Threatened Species.   Downloaded on 9 July 2007.

Lophuromys
Mammals described in 1892
Taxonomy articles created by Polbot
Endemic fauna of the Democratic Republic of the Congo